The 1999 IAAF World Cross Country Championships took place on 27 and 28 March 1999.  The races were held at the Barnett Demesne/Queen's University Playing Fields in Belfast, United Kingdom.  Reports of the event were given in The New York Times, in the Herald,  and for the IAAF.

Complete results for senior men, for senior men's teams, for men's short race, for men's short race teams, for junior men, for junior men's teams, senior women, for senior women's teams, for women's short race, for women's short race teams, for junior women,  for junior women's teams, medallists, and the results of British athletes who took part were published.

Medallists

Race results

Senior men's race (12 km)

Note: Athletes in parentheses did not score for the team result

Men's short race (4.236 km)

Note: Athletes in parentheses did not score for the team result

Junior men's race (8.012 km)

Note: Athletes in parentheses did not score for the team result

Senior women's race (8.012 km)

Note: Athletes in parentheses did not score for the team result

Women's short race (4.236 km)

Note: Athletes in parentheses did not score for the team result

Junior women's race (6.124 km)

Note: Athletes in parentheses did not score for the team result

Medal table (unofficial)

Note: Totals include both individual and team medals, with medals in the team competition counting as one medal.

Participation
An unofficial count yields the participation of 759 athletes from 66 countries.  This is in agreement with the official numbers as published.  The announced athlete from  did not show.

 (24)
 (1)
 (5)
 (18)
 (1)
 (24)
 (9)
 (1)
 (23)
 (1)
 (33)
 (1)
 (5)
 (12)
 (1)
 (4)
 (1)
 (1)
 (4)
 (8)
 (3)
 (34)
 (6)
 (11)
 (16)
 (2)
 (8)
 (1)
 (24)
 (36)
 (3)
 (27)
 (22)
 (3)
 (34)
 (6)
 (5)
 (7)
 (6)
 (29)
 (3)
 (10)
 (5)
 (6)
 (2)
 (19)
 (12)
 (10)
 (4)
 (2)
 (3)
 (25)
 (35)
 (2)
 (1)
 (4)
 (12)
 (7)
 (14)
 (13)
 (4)
 (36)
 (36)
 (9)
 (8)
 (17)

See also
 1999 IAAF World Cross Country Championships – Senior men's race
 1999 IAAF World Cross Country Championships – Men's short race
 1999 IAAF World Cross Country Championships – Junior men's race
 1999 IAAF World Cross Country Championships – Senior women's race
 1999 IAAF World Cross Country Championships – Women's short race
 1999 IAAF World Cross Country Championships – Junior women's race
 1999 in athletics (track and field)

References

External links
 Official site

 
1999
Cross Country Championships
Cross Country Championships
Cross Country Championships
20th century in Belfast
International athletics competitions hosted by Northern Ireland
Cross country running in the United Kingdom
March 1999 sports events in the United Kingdom